William A. Thompson (born December 16, 1864 in Greenwich, New York – 1925) was an engineer with the United States Army Corps of Engineers who managed improvements on the Mississippi River.

Thompson's career
Thompson attended high school in Greenwich, and college at the University of Vermont with a degree in civil engineering in 1878. He joined the U.S. Army Corps of Engineers that year. He worked at Rock Island, Illinois until 1885. He was then placed in charge of the suboffice in La Crosse, Wisconsin. In 1896 he moved to La Crosse, and was appointed the Assistant Engineer in charge of the improvements on the Mississippi River from Winona, Minnesota to Prairie du Chien, Wisconsin. He held that post until his death in 1925.

Dredge named after Thompson

A USACE dredge is named after him was designed in 1935. The dredge was built by Dravo Corporation, and christened in 1937 by Thompson's granddaughter. The dredge arrived in its home in Fountain City, Wisconsin on May 22, 1937. It worked on the upper Mississippi River, St. Croix River, and Illinois River until 2006.

References

1864 births
1925 deaths
American marine engineers
Engineers from New York (state)
People from Greenwich (town), New York
People from La Crosse, Wisconsin